The Lock Hospital for Women was a hospital in Glasgow for women suffering from venereal disease.

Background

The Glasgow lock hospital was established in 1805 at Rottenrow Lane. It moved to 41 Rottenrow in 1845.

The origin of the term 'lock' may be in the French word 'loques', meaning rags and bandages, or from 'loke' a house for lepers. Originally, the patients included women, usually those working as Prostitutes,  and even children who had been infected with syphilis. The hospital depended on funding from subscribers in cash or in kind, which in 1829 included stationery, vinegar and coal. The annual report from 1814 listed a remarkable 450 subscribers.

People associated with Glasgow Lock Hospital
Alice McLaren  
Elizabeth Margaret Pace 
James McCune Smith 1930s

See also
London Lock Hospital
Lock hospital
Westmoreland Lock Hospital

References

External links 
 Image of Glasgow Lock Hospital

Hospitals in Glasgow
Hospitals established in 1805
Health in Glasgow
Defunct hospitals in Scotland
Women's health in the United Kingdom
Sexual health